"Schrödinger's Kitten" is a 1988 novella by American writer George Alec Effinger, which won both a Hugo Award and a Nebula Award, as well as the Japanese Seiun Award.

The story utilizes a form of the many-worlds hypothesis, and is named after the Schrödinger's cat thought experiment. It first appeared in Omni.

Plot summary

The story follows a Middle-Eastern woman, Jehan Fatima Ashûfi, through various realities, ranging from one in which she is raped when still a girl, subsequently abandoned by her family and dies alone, to one in which she is sentenced to death for killing her would-be rapist and being unable to pay the "blood price" to his family, and another in which she becomes a physicist and companion to well-known German scientists ranging from Heisenberg to Schrödinger, and subsequently prevents the Nazis from developing nuclear weapons during World War II by simply forwarding "unintelligible scientific papers" to key politicians looking into the idea.

She is, unusually, aware of the existence of these realities, which she perceives as "visions" and assumes might come to her from Allah. Throughout different points in the story, the adult Jehan of some realities struggles to reconcile her religious upbringing and "visions" with her scientific profession; in the end, however, an aged Jehan finds satisfaction in the explanation of Hugh Everett's theory regarding the possibility of alternate realities, which fits with her personal experiences.

Awards and nominations
"Schrödinger's Kitten" won the Hugo Award for Best Novelette in 1989, as well as a Nebula Award and the Seiun Award.

See also

 Many worlds hypothesis
 Schrödinger's cat

1988 novels
1988 science fiction novels
Hugo Award for Best Novelette winning works
Nebula Award for Best Novelette-winning works
Physics in fiction
Quantum fiction novels
Works originally published in Omni (magazine)
Theodore Sturgeon Award-winning works